Synanthedon martjanovi is a moth of the family Sesiidae. It is found in Russia and Japan.

The larvae feed on Populus tremula and possibly Populus davidiana.

References

Moths described in 1918
Sesiidae